Founded in Worcester, Massachusetts in 1987, the Greater Worcester Land Trust is a non-profit land conservation organization dedicated to the protection of important lands in Worcester and the surrounding towns (the two concentric rings around the City of Worcester). As a conservation land trust the trust's properties are managed simultaneously for wildlife habitat and passive recreation (hiking trails, walking, cross-country skiing, snow-shoeing, birdwatching, etc.)

GWLT is primarily a volunteer based organization with a volunteer Board of Directors, Volunteer Conservation Ranger's who monitor the Trust's holdings, and GWLT Volunteers who blaze trails, install signs and waterbars, and redress illegal activities like dumping or erosion due to motorized vehicles.

The Trust manages  of land and monitors  of Conservation Restrictions (called Conservation Easements outside the Commonwealth of Massachusetts) in Worcester, Leicester, Spencer, Paxton, Holden, Boylston, West Boylston, Auburn, Grafton, and Charlton.

In 2009 the Greater Worcester Land Trust and the West Boylston Land Trust merged their conservation holdings and membership.

In 2019 the Greater Worcester Land Trust and the Paxton Land Trust merged their conservation holdings and membership.

The Trust's headquarters are on the first floor of 4 Ash Street, Worcester, Massachusetts 01608.

Area partners and sister trusts:
 Charlton Heritage Preservation Trust
 Clinton Greenway Conservation Trust
 Dudley Conservation Land Trust
 East Quabbin Land Trust
 Grafton Land Trust
 Metacomet Land Trust
 Opacum Land Trust
 Princeton Land Trust
 Rutland Land Conservancy
 Sterling Land Trust
 Sudbury Valley Trustees
 White Oak Land Conservation Society

External links
Greater Worcester Land Trust, Inc.

Land trusts in Massachusetts
Organizations based in Worcester, Massachusetts
Organizations established in 1987
1987 establishments in Massachusetts